Canada's video game industry consists of approximately 32,300 employees across 937 companies. In 2021, the industry generated an estimated US$ 3.4 billion in revenue, having grown by 20% since 2019. Video game development is beginning to rival the film and television production industry as a major contributor to the Canadian economy.

History
The first documented commercial Canadian video game release was Les Têtards published by Logidisque in 1982. However, Evolution and BC's Quest for Tires, both released in 1983, were the first video games developed in Canada that gained substantial commercial success. Chris Gray and Peter Liepa, from Toronto and Ottawa respectively, together created Boulder Dash in 1983 which was later acquired and published by First Star Software. 

In the past decade, more companies are moving from the West Coast to Ontario and Quebec, where there is more government support for studios and the cost of living is lower. For example, Ubisoft opened Ubisoft Montreal in 1997 with government incentives. The studio has since grown to be one of the largest single-location studios by employee count and led other video game developers to launch studios in Montreal, including Electronic Arts and Warner Bros. Interactive Entertainment. Montreal itself saw a growth in younger professionals coming to the city, not only in video game programming but other technology fields. Ubisoft has since expanded out to other Canadian cities, including Ubisoft's Montreal sister studios Ubisoft Quebec and Ubisoft Saguenay. However, this draw to the eastern side of Canada has left Vancouver, also once similarly thriving with video game developers, seeing its impact on the industry wane.

Demographics

In 2015, approximately 19 million Canadians identified as gamers (54% of the Canadian population). The average Canadian gamer was 33 years old, and slightly more likely to be male. The gender split was measured to be 52% male to 48% female. Console game revenue fell 32% from 2013 to 2015 but still accounts for 35% of the revenue produced by Canada's video games industry. Canadians tend to prefer consoles over portable gaming. Mobile games saw an increase in revenue of 20% from 2013 to 2015, and accounted for 31% of the total revenue earned by Canada's video games industry. Computer game sales fell marginally (3%) and compose 25% of the industry's revenue. The most popular game genres in Canada are, in order of most to least popular, action-adventures, family games, and shooters.

Research
There has recently been a substantial amount of interest in the emergence of video game development as an industry in Canada and its impact on the economy, the creative industries, the role studios play in specific city ecosystems and how video games affect people physically and mentally. A recent study was done at McMaster University studying how playing video games improves the eyesight of those who suffer from problems pertaining to eyesight. Montreal, Quebec, is a particularly popular subject of study due to the maturity of the gaming industry and its overall urban ecology.

Video game industry

80% of all Canadian game studios are located in Quebec, British Columbia and Ontario. Ontario is the largest producer of video games in Canada, housing 31.8% of all game studios (10 of which are large companies) and has annual expenditures of $818.4 million. Quebec is the second largest, with 31.1% of companies residing in the province (22 of which are large companies) and spends $2.3 billion annually. The third largest video game producer is British Columbia, which has 17.2% of all game studios (19 of which are large companies) and has annual expenditures of $1 billion.

Education
Many Canadian post secondary institutions offer industry relevant courses in areas such as computer programming, animation/concept art, and game design. Many of the top programs are offered in either Vancouver, British Columbia or Toronto, Ontario and the Greater Toronto Area. Industry employees earn an average of $78,600 annually and the average age of an employee in this industry is 32 years old. According to the Entertainment Software Association of Canada in their 2015 report the skills that are most lacking in current recruitment pools are programming, art and animation, game design and data analysis.  it is anticipated that approximately 1,377 new jobs will be filled in the next 12–24 months, with approximately 40% being intermediate or senior level creative positions and approximately 60% being intermediate or senior level technical jobs.

Studios
Canada is home to some of the biggest studios in the industry. Edmonton, Alberta, hosts BioWare and Prince Edward Island is home to Other Ocean Interactive. EA Canada, located in Burnaby, British Columbia, is a major contributor to the industry with popular, global franchises such as FIFA and Need for Speed and has 4 other studios in Canada (Charlottetown, Edmonton, Kitchener and Montreal). Rockstar Vancouver was a sizeable contributor to the Vancouver gaming scene, as well as another Rockstar studio in Toronto. Montreal's Ubisoft studio is getting a large amount of attention worldwide as the lead studio for the Far Cry series and for their contributions to the Assassin's Creed franchise. As a major studio they are attracting other video game developers and studios to Montreal further defining it as the gaming capital of Canada, as well as the other major game studio, Warner Brothers Interactive. Ubisoft Toronto is also a large contributor to the global success of the Far Cry franchises as well as Splinter Cell Blacklist.

As of 2015, the entertainment software industry is growing at unprecedented rates and shows no signs of slowing down. More opportunities are being created to learn the skills relevant to the industry and as more job opportunities are being created allowing this industry to experience a healthy boom. Many strong game development studios choosing to locate to Canada help to not only strengthen the industry but promote its longevity. Large scale gaming events such as the Canadian Videogame Awards, Fan Expo Canada and Comic-Con help to promote the industry and encourage its growth.

See also
Video game crash of 1983

References

External links
The Entertainment Software Association of Canada
Tier Lists for Competitive Games of Canada